Palliduphantes is a genus of dwarf spiders that was first described by Michael I. Saaristo & A. V. Tanasevitch in 2001.

Species
 it contains seventy-four species:
P. altus (Tanasevitch, 1986) – Central Asia
P. alutacius (Simon, 1884) – Europe
P. angustiformis (Simon, 1884) – France (incl. Corsica), Italy (Sardinia)
P. antroniensis (Schenkel, 1933) – Europe
P. arenicola (Denis, 1964) – France, Switzerland
P. baeumeri Wunderlich, 2020 – Canary Is.
P. banderolatus Barrientos, 2020 – Morocco
P. bayrami Demir, Topçu & Seyyar, 2008 – Turkey
P. bigerrensis (Simon, 1929) – France
P. bolivari (Fage, 1931) – Portugal, Spain, Gibraltar
P. brignolii (Kratochvíl, 1978) – Croatia
P. byzantinus (Fage, 1931) – Italy, Romania, Bulgaria, Macedonia, Greece, Turkey
P. cadiziensis (Wunderlich, 1980) – Portugal, Spain, Gibraltar, Morocco
P. carusoi (Brignoli, 1979) – Italy (Sicily)
P. cebennicus (Simon, 1929) – France
P. ceretanus (Denis, 1962) – France
P. cernuus (Simon, 1884) – France, Spain
P. chenini Bosmans, 2003 – Tunisia
P. conradini (Brignoli, 1971) – Italy
P. constantinescui (Georgescu, 1989) – Romania
P. corfuensis (Wunderlich, 1995) – Greece
P. corsicos (Wunderlich, 1980) – France (Corsica)
P. cortesi Ribera & De Mas, 2003 – Spain
P. culicinus (Simon, 1884) – France, Switzerland
P. dentatidens (Simon, 1929) – France, Italy
P. elburz Tanasevitch, 2017 – Iran
P. eleonorae (Wunderlich, 1995) – Greece
P. epaminondae (Brignoli, 1979) – Greece
P. ericaeus (Blackwall, 1853) – Europe, Russia
P. fagei (Machado, 1939) – Spain
P. fagicola (Simon, 1929) – France
P. florentinus (Caporiacco, 1947) – Italy
P. garganicus (Caporiacco, 1951) – Italy
P. gladiola (Simon, 1884) – France (incl. Corsica)
P. gypsi Ribera & De Mas, 2003 – Spain
P. insignis (O. Pickard-Cambridge, 1913) – Europe
P. intirmus (Tanasevitch, 1987) – Russia, Central Asia
P. istrianus (Kulczyński, 1914) – Eastern Europe
P. kalaensis (Bosmans, 1985) – Algeria
P. khobarum (Charitonov, 1947) – Greece, Turkey, Ukraine, Russia, Central Asia
P. labilis (Simon, 1913) – Algeria, Tunisia
P. ligulifer (Denis, 1952) – Romania
P. liguricus (Simon, 1929) – Europe
P. longiscapus (Wunderlich, 1987) – Canary Is.
P. longiseta (Simon, 1884) – France (Corsica), Italy
P. lorifer (Simon, 1907) – Spain
P. malickyi (Wunderlich, 1980) – Greece (Crete)
P. margaritae (Denis, 1934) – France
P. melitensis (Bosmans, 1994) – Malta
P. milleri (Starega, 1972) – Poland, Slovakia, Romania, Ukraine
P. minimus (Deeleman-Reinhold, 1986) – Cyprus
P. montanus (Kulczyński, 1898) – Germany, Austria, Italy, Turkey
P. oredonensis (Denis, 1950) – France
P. pallidus (O. Pickard-Cambridge, 1871) (type) – Europe
P. palmensis (Wunderlich, 1992) – Canary Is.
P. petruzzielloi Bosmans & Trotta, 2021 – Italy
P. pillichi (Kulczyński, 1915) – Central to south-eastern Europe
P. rubens (Wunderlich, 1987) – Canary Is.
P. salfii (Dresco, 1949) – Italy
P. sanctivincenti (Simon, 1872) – France
P. sbordonii (Brignoli, 1970) – Iran
P. schmitzi (Kulczyński, 1899) – Madeira, Azores
P. solivagus (Tanasevitch, 1986) – Kyrgyzstan
P. spelaeorum (Kulczyński, 1914) – SE Europe (Balkans)
P. stygius (Simon, 1884) – Portugal, Spain, France, Azores
P. tenerifensis (Wunderlich, 1992) – Canary Is.
P. theosophicus (Tanasevitch, 1987) – Nepal
P. tricuspis Bosmans, 2006 – Algeria
P. trnovensis (Drensky, 1931) – Serbia, Montenegro, Macedonia, Bulgaria
P. vadelli Lissner, 2016 – Spain (Majorca)
P. yakourensis Bosmans, 2006 – Algeria
P. zaragozai (Ribera, 1981) – Spain

See also
 List of Linyphiidae species (I–P)

References

Araneomorphae genera
Linyphiidae
Spiders of Africa
Spiders of Asia